The Brockport Golden Eagles (also known as the SUNY Brockport Golden Eagles or the Brockport State Golden Eagles) are composed of 23 teams representing The College at Brockport, State University of New York in intercollegiate athletics, including men and women's basketball, cross country, lacrosse, soccer, swimming & diving, and track and field. Men's sports include baseball, football, ice hockey, and wrestling. Women's sports include field hockey, gymnastics (in NCAA Division I), volleyball, tennis, and softball. The Golden Eagles compete in the NCAA Division III and are members of the State University of New York Athletic Conference for most sports, except for the football team, which competes in the Empire 8 Conference.

Teams

Baseball
Brockport has had 1 Major League Baseball Draft selection since the draft began in 1965.

Basketball
Al Walker, now a pro personnel scout for the NBA's Detroit Pistons and formerly a college coach, played from 1978-81 for the Brockport Golden Eagles.  He earned honorable mention on the Small College All-American team. At Brockport, in 2012 he ranked fifth all-time in rebounds (706; 2nd at the time of his graduation) and 20th in scoring (856), while playing only three seasons.

Football

References

External links
 

 
Rugby union teams in New York (state)